Corindia is a genus of flies in the family Dolichopodidae. It is known from the Afrotropical and Australasian realms, and is closely related to the genus Thrypticus. In Australia, adults of the genus are often found on smooth-barked eucalypt trees, and display a stance similar to that of Medetera. The genus is named after Corindi, a geographical place name of aboriginal origin on the New South Wales northern coast.

Species
Australasian realm:
Corindia amieuensis Bickel, 2014 – New Caledonia
Corindia capricornis Bickel, 1986 – Australia
Corindia collessi Bickel, 1986 – Australia
Corindia cooloola Bickel, 1986 – Australia
Corindia flaviscuta Bickel, 2014 – New Caledonia
Corindia gascoynensis Bickel, 2013 – Australia
Corindia major Bickel, 1986 – Australia
Corindia minor Bickel, 1986 – Australia
Corindia mulleri Bickel, 2014 – Papua New Guinea
Corindia nigricornis Bickel, 1986 – Australia
Corindia robensis Bickel, 1986 – Australia
Corindia torresiana Bickel, 1986 – Australia
Corindia truda Bickel, 1986 – Australia
Afrotropical realm:
Corindia danielssoni Grichanov, 1998 – Gambia, DR Congo
Corindia demoulini Grichanov, 2000 – DR Congo
Corindia saegeri Grichanov, 1998 – DR Congo, Gabon, Namibia
Corindia verschureni Grichanov, 1998 – DR Congo

References 

Dolichopodidae genera
Medeterinae
Diptera of Australasia
Diptera of Africa